BTB/POZ domain-containing protein KCTD12 is a protein that in humans is encoded by the KCTD12 gene.

It may be associated with rumination and Bipolar Disorder.

References

Further reading